Grammonota is a genus of dwarf spiders that was first described by James Henry Emerton in 1882.

Species
 it contains forty species and one subspecies, found in Canada, Colombia, Costa Rica, Cuba, Guatemala, Jamaica, Mexico, Panama, and the United States:
Grammonota angusta Dondale, 1959 – USA, Canada
Grammonota barnesi Dondale, 1959 – USA
Grammonota calcarata Bryant, 1948 – Hispaniola
Grammonota capitata Emerton, 1924 – USA
Grammonota chamberlini Ivie & Barrows, 1935 – USA
Grammonota coloradensis Dondale, 1959 – USA
Grammonota culebra Müller & Heimer, 1991 – Colombia
Grammonota dalunda Chickering, 1970 – Panama
Grammonota dubia (O. Pickard-Cambridge, 1898) – Guatemala
Grammonota electa Bishop & Crosby, 1933 – Costa Rica
Grammonota emertoni Bryant, 1940 – Cuba
Grammonota gentilis Banks, 1898 – North America
Grammonota gigas (Banks, 1896) – USA
Grammonota innota Chickering, 1970 – Panama
Grammonota inornata Emerton, 1882 – USA, Canada
Grammonota insana (Banks, 1898) – Mexico
Grammonota inusiata Bishop & Crosby, 1933 – USA
Grammonota jamaicensis Dondale, 1959 – Jamaica
Grammonota kincaidi (Banks, 1906) – USA
Grammonota lutacola Chickering, 1970 – Panama
Grammonota maculata Banks, 1896 – USA, Costa Rica
Grammonota maritima Emerton, 1925 – Canada
Grammonota nigriceps Banks, 1898 – Mexico
Grammonota nigrifrons Gertsch & Mulaik, 1936 – USA
Grammonota ornata (O. Pickard-Cambridge, 1875) – USA, Canada
Grammonota pallipes Banks, 1895 – USA
Grammonota pergrata (O. Pickard-Cambridge, 1894) – Guatemala
Grammonota pictilis (O. Pickard-Cambridge, 1875) (type) – USA, Canada
Grammonota salicicola Chamberlin, 1949 – USA
Grammonota samariensis Müller & Heimer, 1991 – Colombia
Grammonota secata Chickering, 1970 – Panama, Colombia
Grammonota semipallida Emerton, 1919 – Canada
Grammonota subarctica Dondale, 1959 – USA (Alaska)
Grammonota suspiciosa Gertsch & Mulaik, 1936 – USA
Grammonota tabuna Chickering, 1970 – Costa Rica, Panama
Grammonota teresta Chickering, 1970 – Mexico, Panama, Colombia
Grammonota texana (Banks, 1899) – USA
Grammonota trivittata Banks, 1895 – USA
Grammonota t. georgiana Chamberlin & Ivie, 1944 – USA
Grammonota vittata Barrows, 1919 – USA
Grammonota zephyra Dondale, 1959 – USA

See also
 List of Linyphiidae species (A–H)

References

Araneomorphae genera
Linyphiidae
Spiders of North America
Spiders of South America